Quantum chemistry, also called molecular quantum mechanics, is a branch of physical chemistry focused on the application of quantum mechanics to chemical systems, particularly towards the quantum-mechanical calculation of electronic contributions to physical and chemical properties of molecules, materials, and solutions at the atomic level. These calculations include systematically applied approximations intended to make calculations computationally feasible while still capturing as much information about important contributions to the computed wave functions as well as to observable properties such as structures, spectra, and thermodynamic properties. Quantum chemistry is also concerned with the computation of quantum effects on molecular dynamics and chemical kinetics.  

Chemists rely heavily on spectroscopy through which information regarding the quantization of energy on a molecular scale can be obtained. Common methods are infra-red (IR) spectroscopy, nuclear magnetic resonance (NMR) spectroscopy, and scanning probe microscopy. Quantum chemistry may be applied to the prediction and verification of spectroscopic data as well as other experimental data. 

Many quantum chemistry studies are focused on the electronic ground state and excited states of individual atoms and molecules as well as the study of reaction pathways and transition states that occur during chemical reactions. Spectroscopic properties may also be predicted. Typically, such studies assume the electronic wave function is adiabatically parameterized by the nuclear positions (i.e., the Born–Oppenheimer approximation). A wide variety of approaches are used, including semi-empirical methods, density functional theory, Hartree-Fock calculations, quantum Monte Carlo methods, and coupled cluster methods. 

Understanding electronic structure and molecular dynamics through the development of computational solutions to the Schrödinger equation is a central goal of quantum chemistry. Progress in the field depends on overcoming several challenges, including the need to increase the accuracy of the results for small molecular systems, and to also increase the size of large molecules that can be realistically subjected to computation, which is limited by scaling considerations — the computation time increases as a power of the number of atoms.

History
Some view the birth of quantum chemistry as starting with the discovery of the Schrödinger equation and its application to the hydrogen atom in 1926. However, the 1927 article of Walter Heitler (1904–1981) and Fritz London, is often recognized as the first milestone in the history of quantum chemistry. This is the first application of quantum mechanics to the diatomic hydrogen molecule, and thus to the phenomenon of the chemical bond. Hans Hellmann was first to publish a book on Quantum Chemistry in Russian  and in German languages  where he considered multi-particles interactions. In the following years much progress was accomplished by Robert S. Mulliken, Max Born, J. Robert Oppenheimer, Hans Hellmann, Linus Pauling, Erich Hückel, Douglas Hartree, Vladimir Fock, to cite a few. The history of quantum chemistry also goes through the 1838 discovery of cathode rays by Michael Faraday, the 1859 statement of the black-body radiation problem by Gustav Kirchhoff, the 1877 suggestion by Ludwig Boltzmann that the energy states of a physical system could be discrete, and the 1900 quantum hypothesis by Max Planck that any energy radiating atomic system can theoretically be divided into a number of discrete energy elements ε such that each of these energy elements is proportional to the frequency ν with which they each individually radiate energy and a numerical value called Planck's constant. Then, in 1905, to explain the photoelectric effect (1839), i.e., that shining light on certain materials can function to eject electrons from the material, Albert Einstein postulated, based on Planck's quantum hypothesis, that light itself consists of individual quantum particles, which later came to be called photons (1926). In the years to follow, this theoretical basis slowly began to be applied to chemical structure, reactivity, and bonding. Probably the greatest contribution to the field was made by Linus Pauling.

Electronic structure 

The first step in solving a quantum chemical problem is usually solving the Schrödinger equation (or Dirac equation in relativistic quantum chemistry) with the electronic molecular Hamiltonian. This is called determining the electronic structure of the molecule. It can be said that the electronic structure of a molecule or crystal implies essentially its chemical properties. An exact solution for the Schrödinger equation can only be obtained for the hydrogen atom (though exact solutions for the bound state energies of the hydrogen molecular ion have been identified in terms of the generalized Lambert W function).  Since all other atomic, or molecular systems, involve the motions of three or more "particles", their Schrödinger equations cannot be solved exactly and so approximate solutions must be sought.

Valence bond 

Although the mathematical basis of quantum chemistry had been laid by Schrödinger in 1926, it is generally accepted that the first true calculation in quantum chemistry was that of the German physicists Walter Heitler and Fritz London on the hydrogen (H2) molecule in 1927. Heitler and London's method was extended by the American theoretical physicist John C. Slater and the American theoretical chemist Linus Pauling to become the valence-bond (VB) [or Heitler–London–Slater–Pauling (HLSP)] method. In this method, attention is primarily devoted to the pairwise interactions between atoms, and this method therefore correlates closely with classical chemists' drawings of bonds. It focuses on how the atomic orbitals of an atom combine to give individual chemical bonds when a molecule is formed, incorporating the two key concepts of orbital hybridization and resonance.

Molecular orbital 

An alternative approach was developed in 1929 by Friedrich Hund and Robert S. Mulliken, in which electrons are described by mathematical functions delocalized over an entire molecule. The Hund–Mulliken approach or molecular orbital (MO) method is less intuitive to chemists, but has turned out capable of predicting spectroscopic properties better than the VB method. This approach is the conceptual basis of the Hartree–Fock method and further post Hartree–Fock methods.

Density functional theory 

The Thomas–Fermi model was developed independently by Thomas and Fermi in 1927. This was the first attempt to describe many-electron systems on the basis of electronic density instead of wave functions, although it was not very successful in the treatment of entire molecules. The method did provide the basis for what is now known as density functional theory (DFT). Modern day DFT uses the Kohn–Sham method, where the density functional is split into four terms; the Kohn–Sham kinetic energy, an external potential, exchange and correlation energies. A large part of the focus on developing DFT is on improving the exchange and correlation terms. Though this method is less developed than post Hartree–Fock methods, its significantly lower computational requirements (scaling typically no worse than n3 with respect to n basis functions, for the pure functionals) allow it to tackle larger polyatomic molecules and even macromolecules. This computational affordability and often comparable accuracy to MP2 and CCSD(T) (post-Hartree–Fock methods) has made it one of the most popular methods in computational chemistry.

Chemical dynamics 
A further step can consist of solving the Schrödinger equation with the total molecular Hamiltonian in order to study the motion of molecules. Direct solution of the Schrödinger equation is called quantum dynamics, whereas its solution within the semiclassical approximation is called semiclassical dynamics. Purely classical simulations of molecular motion are referred to as molecular dynamics (MD). Another approach to dynamics is a hybrid framework known as mixed quantum-classical dynamics; yet another hybrid framework uses the Feynman path integral formulation to add quantum corrections to molecular dynamics, which is called path integral molecular dynamics. Statistical approaches, using for example classical and quantum Monte Carlo methods,  are also possible and are particularly useful for describing equilibrium distributions of states.

Adiabatic chemical dynamics 

In adiabatic dynamics, interatomic interactions are represented by single scalar potentials called potential energy surfaces. This is the Born–Oppenheimer approximation introduced by Born and Oppenheimer in 1927. Pioneering applications of this in chemistry were performed by Rice and Ramsperger in 1927 and Kassel in 1928, and generalized into the RRKM theory in 1952 by Marcus who took the transition state theory developed by Eyring in 1935 into account. These methods enable simple estimates of unimolecular reaction rates from a few characteristics of the potential surface.

Non-adiabatic chemical dynamics 

Non-adiabatic dynamics consists of taking the interaction between several coupled potential energy surface (corresponding to different electronic quantum states of the molecule). The coupling terms are called vibronic couplings. The pioneering work in this field was done by Stueckelberg, Landau, and Zener in the 1930s, in their work on what is now known as the Landau–Zener transition. Their formula allows the transition probability between two diabatic potential curves in the neighborhood of an avoided crossing to be calculated. Spin-forbidden reactions are one type of non-adiabatic reactions where at least one change in spin state occurs when progressing from reactant to product.

See also 

 Atomic physics
 Computational chemistry
 Condensed matter physics
 Car–Parrinello molecular dynamics
 Electron localization function
 International Academy of Quantum Molecular Science
 Molecular modelling
 Physical chemistry
 List of quantum chemistry and solid-state physics software
 QMC@Home
 Quantum Aspects of Life
 Quantum electrochemistry
 Relativistic quantum chemistry
 Theoretical physics
Spin forbidden reactions

References

 
 
 
 
 Gavroglu, Kostas; Ana Simões: Neither Physics nor Chemistry: A History of Quantum Chemistry, MIT Press, 2011, 
 Karplus M., Porter R.N. (1971). Atoms and Molecules. An introduction for students of physical chemistry, Benjamin–Cummings Publishing Company, 
 
 
 
 
 
 
   Considers the extent to which chemistry and especially the periodic system has been reduced to quantum mechanics.

External links 
 The Sherrill Group – Notes
 ChemViz Curriculum Support Resources
 Early ideas in the history of quantum chemistry